A fay is a fairy.

Fay or FAY may also refer to:

People
 Fay (given name)
 Fay (surname)

Places
France
 Fay, Orne
 Fay, Sarthe
 Fay, Somme

Iran
 Alavoneh-ye Fay, or Fāy, a village in Khuzestan Province

United States
 Fay, Missouri
 Fay, Oklahoma

Storms
 Hurricane Fay, 2014
 Tropical Storm Fay (2002), 2002 tropical cyclone
 Tropical Storm Fay (2008), 2008 tropical cyclone
 Tropical Storm Fay (2020), 2020 tropical cyclone

Other uses
 Fay (TV series), television series broadcast from 1975–76
 Fayetteville Regional Airport, serving Fayetteville, North Carolina, United States
 Fayetteville station, Amtrak code FAY
 Fay, Islamic property right mentioned in Surah 4:6 of the Qur'an
 Fay School, an independent, coeducational junior-prep school located in Southborough, Massachusetts, United States
 the Hebrew letter fe

See also
 Fays (disambiguation)
 Faye (disambiguation)
 Fey (disambiguation)
 Fairy (disambiguation)
 Justice Fay (disambiguation)